Navekat or Nevkat  was an ancient Silk Road city that flourished between the 6th and 12th centuries. It lies near the modern village of Krasnaya Rechka, in the Chüy Valley, present-day Kyrgyzstan, about 30 kilometers east of Bishkek. It was one of the most important trading centres of the region. Navekat was inscribed on the UNESCO World Heritage List in 2014 as a part of the site "Silk Roads: the Routes Network of Chang'an-Tianshan Corridor".

Archaeological site 
Navekat had two walls: the first around Shahristan, the traditional administrative center of this type of city; the second wall was more than 18 kilometers long with public buildings, markets, gardens and even farms inside.
There was a citadel in the North-eastern part of the city, which was built on a massive earthen platform. The volume of this platform was about 13 million cubic meters; probably the largest man-made mound in the world.

During archaeological excavations the artifacts uncovered included a golden burial mask, an 8 meter-long reclining Buddha statue in the one of the two Buddhist temples. There were other artifacts showing the presence of Buddhists, Zoroastrians, Nestorians, Manicheans.

See also
Suyab 
Balasagun
Burana tower

References

Archaeological sites in Kyrgyzstan
Populated places along the Silk Road
Chüy Region
Former populated places in Kyrgyzstan

Невакет